The Madeira Islands Open was a men's professional golf tournament on the European Tour played from 1993 to 2015 on Madeira, an autonomous region of Portugal.

History
The tournament had one of the smallest prize funds on the tour (€600,000 in 2015), and few of the tour's top players took part. From 2002 to 2005, and again from 2011 to 2015, it was a dual-ranking event with the Challenge Tour. It was played opposite the Volvo World Match Play Championship in 2011 and 2013. In 2015, it was played opposite the Saltire Energy Paul Lawrie Match Play after the rescheduling caused by severe weather postponed the event four months.

It was hosted at Clube de Golf do Santo da Serra (1993–2008, 2012–15) and at Porto Santo Golfe (2009–11). For its last five years of existence, it was one of two European Tour events annually staged in Portugal, the other being the Portugal Masters. The 2015 event was rescheduled from March to August due to weather.

Winners

Notes

References

External links
Coverage on the European Tour's official site
Coverage on the European Tour's official site, 2015
Relevant Portuguese Golf Travel website

Former European Tour events
Former Challenge Tour events
Golf tournaments in Portugal
Sport in Madeira
Recurring sporting events established in 1993
Recurring sporting events disestablished in 2015
1993 establishments in Portugal
2015 disestablishments in Portugal
Defunct sports competitions in Portugal